WLSS is a radio station serving the Sarasota, Florida area with a news/talk format. It broadcasts on AM frequency 930 kHz and is under ownership of Salem Communications.

WLSS is the most powerful AM station in the Sarasota-Bradenton market. It has formerly been under the call sign of WKXY and WUGL.

Programming and history
The content of WLSS's talk programming is conservative with show hosts such as Phil Grande of The Phil's Gang Radio Show, Hugh Hewitt and Mike Gallagher. The weekend show line up includes Kim Komando and John Ziegler.

WLSS also serves as the Sarasota affiliate of the Florida Gators radio network, broadcasting football and men's basketball games.

On January 5, 2015, WLSS rebranded as "930 The Answer".

Translators
WLSS broadcasts on an FM translator as part of the FCC's AM Revitalization authorization.

References

External links
WLSS 930 The Answer

LSS
News and talk radio stations in the United States
Radio stations established in 1983
Salem Media Group properties
1983 establishments in Florida